The Filmfare Special Jury Award is given by the Filmfare Magazine as part of its annual Filmfare Awards South for South Indian films. It was decided on 17th Annual Filmfare Awards and started from 20th Annual Filmfare Awards held in 1973. It acknowledges a special and unique performance and encourages artistes, filmmakers and musicians to break new ground in drama, direction, music and acting. From 2011 Critics Award for Best Actor Started irregularly. In 2015 Critics Award for Best Actor & Best Actress become regularly in all four language.

See also 
 Filmfare Awards South

References 

Special Jury